The 65th Filmfare Awards ceremony, presented by The Times Group, honored the best Indian Hindi-language films of 2019. The ceremony was held on 15 February 2020 in Guwahati and broadcast on Colors TV the following day. This is the first time in six decades that a Filmfare ceremony was held outside Mumbai. Karan Johar and Vicky Kaushal were hosts of the award ceremony.

A curtain raiser ceremony was held in Mumbai on 2 February 2020, which honoured the winners of technical and short film awards. In the same function, the nominations for popular awards were also announced. Actress Neha Dhupia was the host of this ceremony. 

Gully Boy led the ceremony with 19 nominations, followed by Uri: The Surgical Strike with 13 nominations and Article 15 and Sonchiriya with 11 nominations each.

Gully Boy won a record 13 awards, the most awards for a single film in a year, thus breaking the record set by Black (2005) with 11 wins at the 51st Filmfare Awards. Additionally, it also became the second film to win all four acting awards, having been achieved previously 21 years earlier by Kuch Kuch Hota Hai (1998) at the 44th Filmfare Awards. 

At age 92, Kamini Kaushal set a record for becoming the oldest nominee of an acting Filmfare Award, receiving a Best Supporting Actress nomination for her performance in Kabir Singh. However, she lost the award to Amruta Subhash who won the award for Gully Boy. 

The ceremony proved to be highly controversial, as fans called out Filmfare for snubbing highly acclaimed films like Chhichhore, Kesari and Uri: The Surgical Strike in favor of Gully Boy. Subsequently, when the Filmfare Award for Best Lyricist went to the rap song "Apna Time Aayega" from Gully Boy instead of the patriotic song "Teri Mitti" from Kesari, lyricist Manoj Muntashir expressed his disappointment at the decision on Twitter, pledging not to attend future award ceremonies, and gained support from fans and other musicians alike.

Winners and nominees
Source:

Popular awards

Critics' Awards

Special Awards

Technical awards
Nominations for the Technical awards were announced on 31 January 2020 and the winners were subsequently awarded on 2 February 2020.

Short Film Awards
Winners for the short film awards were announced on 2 February 2020.

Controversies 
Gully Boy attracted controversy over its 13 wins at the 65th Filmfare Awards. Several Twitter users and fans were extremely disappointed and made calls to boycott the awards, with #BoycottFilmfare trending on the micro-blogging site. While many thought that the film was a deserving winner, others were unhappy and even termed the awards as "snub fare", calling it a move to "justify sending it as a nomination for the Oscars". Subsequently, when the Best Lyricist went to the rap song "Apna Time Aayega" instead of the patriotic song "Teri Mitti" from the 2019 war film Kesari, lyricist Manoj Muntashir tweeted his disappointment at the decision, pledging not to attend future award ceremonies, and gained support from fans and other musicians alike.

Superlatives

See also
 Filmfare Awards
 List of Bollywood films of 2019

References

External links
 Filmfare Official Website
 Filmfare Awards 2020

Filmfare Awards
2020 Indian film awards